Adam Wolff (14 August 1899 – 17 February 1984) was a Polish historian and sailor, who represented Poland at the 1928 Summer Olympics in Amsterdam, Netherlands.

References

External links
 

1899 births
1984 deaths
Polish male sailors (sport)
Olympic sailors of Poland
Sailors at the 1928 Summer Olympics – 12' Dinghy
Sportspeople from Warsaw
People from Warsaw Governorate
20th-century Polish people
Collaborators of the Polish Biographical Dictionary